Sue Wallace is a British character actress.

Early life 
Wallace was born in the north of England.

Education 
Wallace studied Drama and English at the University of Birmingham.

Career 
Wallace started her career as a teacher. Wallace went on to have a lengthy career on television and the stage since the early 1980s in among others, Juliet Bravo, Bergerac, Making Out, The Bill, Common as Muck, Heartbeat and Doctors.

Wallace appeared in different roles in various television works by Victoria Wood, including Screenplay: Happy Since I Met You in 1981, Victoria Wood as Seen on TV in the mid-1980s, the television film Pat and Margaret in 1994, one episode of Dinnerladies in 1998 and finally in Wood's television historical drama film Housewife, 49 in 2006.

Film roles include Is There Anybody There? and as Janet in I Give It a Year.

Filmography

Films 
 1978 She Loves Me 
 1985 Blue Money - Letty.
 2008 Is Anybody There? - Mrs. Hitler.
 2013 I Give It a Year - Janet.

References

External links 

English television actresses
Alumni of the University of Birmingham
Living people
Year of birth missing (living people)